Metro North may refer to:

 Metro-North Railroad, a commuter railroad serving parts of New York and Connecticut in the United States
 Dublin Metro#Metro North, a branch of the proposed Dublin Metro, in Dublin, Ireland
 Metro North Mall, Kansas City, Missouri
 MetroNorth Corridor, proposed St. Louis MetroLink alignment